A lineworker (or powerline worker) constructs and maintains the electric transmission and distribution facilities that deliver electrical energy to industrial, commercial, and residential establishments. A lineworker installs, services, and emergency repairs electrical lines in the case of lightning, wind, ice storm, or ground disruptions. Whereas lineworkers generally work at outdoor installations, those who install and maintain electrical wiring inside buildings are electricians.

History
The occupation had begun in 1844 when the first telegraph wires were strung between Washington, D.C. and Baltimore carrying the famous message of Samuel Morse, "What hath God wrought?" The first telegraph station was built in Chicago in 1848, by 1861 a web of lines spanned the United States and in 1868 the first permanent telegraph cable was successfully laid across the Atlantic Ocean. Telegraph lines could be strung on trees, but wooden poles were quickly adopted as the preferred method. The term lineworker was used for those who set wooden poles and strung wire. The term continued in use with the invention of the telephone in the 1870s and the beginning of electrification in the 1890s.

This new electrical power work was more hazardous than telegraph or telephone work because of the risk of electrocution. Between the 1890s and the 1930s, line work was considered one of the most hazardous jobs. This led to the formation of labor organizations to represent the workers and advocate for their safety. This also led to the establishment of apprenticeship programs and the establishment of more stringent safety standards, starting in the late 1930s. The union movement in the United States was led by lineworker Henry Miller, who in 1890 was elected president of the Electrical Wiremen and Linemen's Union, No. 5221 of the American Federation of Labor.

United States
The rural electrification drive during the New Deal led to a wide expansion in the number of jobs in the electric power industry. Many powerline workers during that period traveled around the country following jobs as they became available in tower construction, substation construction, and wire stringing. They often lived in temporary camps set up near the project they were working on, or in boarding houses if the work was in a town or city, and relocating every few weeks or months. The occupation was lucrative at the time, but the hazards and the extensive travel limited its appeal.

A brief drive to electrify some railroads on the East Coast of the US-led to the development of specialization of powerline workers who installed and maintained catenary overhead lines. Growth in this branch of linework declined after most railroads favored diesel over electric engines for replacement of steam engines.

The occupation evolved during the 1940s and 1950s with the expansion of residential electrification. This led to an increase in the number of powerline workers needed to maintain power distribution circuits and provide emergency repairs. Maintenance powerline workers mostly stayed in one place, although sometimes they were called to travel to assist repairs. During the 1950s, some electric lines began to be installed in tunnels, expanding the scope of the work.

Duties

Powerline workers work on electrically energized (live) and de-energized (dead) power lines. They may perform several tasks associated with power lines, including installation or replacement of distribution equipment such as capacitor banks, distribution transformers on poles, insulators and fuses. These duties include the use of ropes, knots, and lifting equipment. These tasks may have to be performed with primitive manual tools where accessibility is limited. Such conditions are common in rural or mountainous areas that are inaccessible to trucks.

High voltage transmission lines can be worked live with proper setups. The lineworker must be isolated from the ground. The lineworker wears special conductive clothing that is connected to the live power line, at which point the line and the lineworker are at the same potential, allowing the lineworker to handle the wire. The lineworker may still be electrocuted if he completes an electrical circuit, for example by handling both ends of a broken conductor. Such work is often done by helicopter by specially trained powerline workers.  Isolated line work is only used for transmission-level voltages and sometimes for the higher distribution voltages. Live wire work is common on low voltage distribution systems within the UK and Australia as all linesmen are trained to work 'live'. Live wire work on high voltage distribution systems within the UK and Australia is carried out by specialist teams.

Training
Becoming a lineworker usually involves starting as an apprentice and a four-year training program before becoming a "Journey Lineworker". Apprentice powerline workers are trained in all types of work from operating equipment and climbing to proper techniques and safety standards. Schools throughout the United States offer a pre-apprentice lineworker training program such as Southeast Lineman Training Center and Northwest Lineman College.

Safety

Lineworkers, especially those who deal with live electrical apparatus, use personal protective equipment (PPE) as protection against inadvertent contact. This includes rubber gloves, rubber sleeves, bucket liners, and protective blankets.

When working with energized power lines, powerline workers must use protection to eliminate any contact with the energized line. The requirements for PPEs and associated permissible voltage depends on applicable regulations in the jurisdiction as well as company policy. Voltages higher than those that can be worked using gloves are worked with special sticks known as hot-line tools or hot sticks, with which power lines can be safely handled from a distance. Powerline workers must also wear special rubber insulating gear when working with live wires to protect against any accidental contact with the wire. The buckets powerline workers sometimes work from are also insulated with fiberglass.

De-energized power lines can be hazardous as they can still be energized from another source such as interconnection or interaction with another circuit even when they appear to be shut off. For example, a higher-voltage distribution level circuit may feed several lower-voltage distribution circuits through transformers. If the higher voltage circuit is de-energized, but if lower-voltage circuits connected remain energized, the higher voltage circuit will remain energized. Another problem can arise when de-energized wires become energized through electrostatic or electromagnetic induction from energized wires nearby.

All live line work PPE must be kept clean from contaminants and regularly tested for di-electric integrity. This is done by the use of high voltage electrical testing equipment.

Other general items of PPE such as helmets are usually replaced at regular intervals.

See also
 Overhead cable

References

External links

 Thomas M. Shoemaker and James E. Mack. (2002) The Lineman's and Cableman's Handbook. Edwin B. Kurtz. .
  "How Linemen Handle Hot Wires And Stay Alive" , July 1949, Popular Science basics explained on lineman safety for the general public
 Inter-Utility Overhead Trainers Association

Construction trades workers
Crafts
Electric power
Skills